Linda Kash (born 17 January 1961) is a Canadian actress.

Career
An alumna of Second City, she played Trudy Weissman in the 1998 Jean Smart sitcom Style & Substance. She has also played various roles in popular television series, such as Seinfeld and Everybody Loves Raymond. In 2003, she was the cocreator of The Joe Blow Show, a television pilot which starred her husband Paul O'Sullivan.

She is best known for her role as the Kraft Philadelphia Cream Cheese Angel, appearing in various commercials advertising the product.

In May 2011, she was announced as the morning show host on CJWV-FM, a new radio station in Peterborough, Ontario, with cohost Dan Duran. She and her husband Paul O'Sullivan also operated the Peterborough Academy of Performing Arts.

She portrayed socialite and philanthropist Molly Brown in the 2012 Global/ITV mini-series Titanic.

Personal life
Kash was born in Montreal, the daughter of actress and opera singer Maureen Forrester and violinist/conductor Eugene Kash. Her brother is actor Daniel Kash. Her father's family was Jewish, whereas her mother converted to Judaism.

Her partner Paul O'Sullivan, also an actor and Second City alumnus, was killed in a car accident on 18 May 2012. Together they had three children.

Filmography

Film

Television

Awards and nominations

References

External links
 

1961 births
Actresses from Montreal
Anglophone Quebec people
Canadian film actresses
Canadian people of Jewish descent
Canadian people of Irish descent
Canadian people of Scottish descent
Jewish Canadian actresses
Canadian radio hosts
Canadian voice actresses
Canadian television actresses
Living people
Canadian women radio hosts
20th-century Canadian actresses
21st-century Canadian actresses